Gabrijel Radojičić (born 9 October 1973) is a Serbian football manager and former striker.

During his journeyman career, Radojičić played professionally in Serbia and Montenegro, France, Bulgaria, Hong Kong, and Bosnia and Herzegovina.

Playing career
After spending three years at Rudar Pljevlja, Radojičić signed with Obilić in 1999. He was the team's leading scorer in his debut season with 15 league goals. After playing in two games for Obilić at the start of the new season, Radojičić switched to city rivals Milicionar.

In early 2001, Radojičić moved to France and joined Grenoble. He helped the club win the Championnat National later that season. In early 2002, Radojičić signed with Bulgarian club Belasitsa Petrich, spending there the next two years.

Managerial career
Radojičić was manager of several lower league clubs, including Serbian League East's Jedinstvo Paraćin and Serbian League West's Sloga Petrovac.

References

External links
 
 

ASA Issy players
Association football forwards
Championnat National players
ESA Brive players
Expatriate footballers in Bosnia and Herzegovina
Expatriate footballers in Bulgaria
Expatriate footballers in Hong Kong
First League of Serbia and Montenegro players
First Professional Football League (Bulgaria) players
FK Milicionar players
FK Obilić players
FK Palilulac Beograd players
FK Rudar Pljevlja players
FK Sloga Petrovac na Mlavi players
Grenoble Foot 38 players
Hong Kong First Division League players
Kitchee SC players
NK Čelik Zenica players
PFC Belasitsa Petrich players
Premier League of Bosnia and Herzegovina players
Second Professional Football League (Bulgaria) players
Serbia and Montenegro expatriate footballers
Serbia and Montenegro expatriate sportspeople in Bulgaria
Serbia and Montenegro expatriate sportspeople in Hong Kong
Serbia and Montenegro footballers
Serbian expatriate footballers
Serbian expatriate sportspeople in Bosnia and Herzegovina
Serbian football managers
Serbian footballers
Footballers from Mulhouse
1973 births
Living people